Greg Razer is an American politician, who was elected to the Missouri House of Representatives in the 2016 elections. A member of the Democratic Party, he represents the 25th district. He was elected to serve Missouri's 7th District in the Missouri Senate, after being elected in the 2020 Missouri State Senate Elections.

Prior to his election to the legislature, Razer was a field organizer for PROMO, the state's major LGBT advocacy organization, and worked on the campaign staff of Senator Claire McCaskill.

References

External links

Living people
Democratic Party Missouri state senators
Democratic Party members of the Missouri House of Representatives
Gay politicians
LGBT state legislators in Missouri
21st-century American politicians
1978 births